Do the Best may refer to:

 Do the Best (Do As Infinity album)
 Do the Best (Chisato Moritaka album)